Jonas Variakojis (May 5, 1892 near , then the Kaunas Governorate, Russian Empire – October 31, 1963 in St. Charles, Illinois, United States) was a Lithuanian army officer.

Early life 

World War I 
Variakojis finished studying at the Vladimir Military School in 1917 and he was mobilized into the Imperial Russian Army, being sent to the Austrian front on the Eastern Front during World War I.

Lithuanian Wars of Independence 
In December 1918 he returned to Lithuania and joined the newly organized Lithuanian army, which was preparing to defend Lithuania against the Red Army during the Lithuanian–Soviet War. Variakojis was ordered to organize the Panevėžys Region Defence Unit, which later became the 4th Infantry Regiment. On February 7, 1919, he led the first Lithuanian battles against the Soviets near Kėdainiai. The Soviet advance was stopped, preventing them from capturing Lithuania's temporary capital, Kaunas. Variakojis with his unit continued to combat the Soviets. They were also deployed against Poland during the Polish–Lithuanian War. 

For his distinguished services during the Lithuanian Wars of Independence, he was awarded several military orders, including the Order of the Cross of Vytis.

Interwar 
In 1926, he retired from active military duty. He briefly served as the Minister of Communications and Minister of Defense between 1928 and 1930.

After the Second World War 
At the end of World War II, he retreated to Germany and then immigrated to the United States, where he died in 1963.

References

Sources
 

1892 births
1963 deaths
People from Panevėžys County
Ministers of Defence of Lithuania
Lithuanian Army officers
Recipients of the Order of the Cross of Vytis
Lithuanian anti-communists